Oronzo Gabriele Costa (26 August 1787, Alessano – 7 November 1867 Naples) was an Italian zoologist.

At first a physician, he taught zoology at the University of Naples.  He wrote 126 papers on various subjects, principally entomology, and in 1846 served as president of the Accademia Pontaniana in Naples.

His two sons, Achille Costa (1823-1899) and Giuseppe Costa, were also both well known zoologists.

Publications

There has been a good deal of confusion over the publication details of his most important work, the 
Fauna del Regno di Napoli (full title: Fauna del Regno di Napoli, ossia, enumerazione di tutti gli animali che abitano le diverse regioni di questo regno e le acque che le bagnano), published over a long period of time, including posthumously, in collaboration with his son, Achille Costa. Taeger and Blank (1996; p. 253) state that for some of the work, Oronzio was merely the editor,  Achille being the actual author, and whose name appears on the title page.

 Fauna Vesuviana (1827). 
 Fauna di Aspromonte (1828). 
 Fauna del Regno di Napoli 1829 – 1886 (continued after his death by Achille Costa)

References

Bibliography

External links
 Biography
 List of his books in BHL
 Texts of published work at GDZ (Göttinger DigitalisierungsZentrum), Göttingen State and University Library

1787 births
1867 deaths
Italian zoologists
Italian entomologists